Due Leoni-Fontana Candida is a station of Line C of the Rome Metro. It is located along the Via Casilina, on Via della Stazione Due Leoni. The previous train station of the Rome–Pantano railway line closed in 2008 and was totally rebuilt into the current Metro station; the stop was opened on 9 November 2014.

External links

Rome Metro Line C stations
Railway stations opened in 2014
2014 establishments in Italy
Railway stations in Italy opened in the 21st century